Hélène de Saint Lager (born 22 May 1957) is a French artist and sculptor based in Paris. Hélène de Saint Lager is particularly known for her furniture made of resin.

References

External links
 Hélène de Saint Lager

Living people
1957 births
French women sculptors
21st-century French women artists